W05DK-D (channel 30) is a low-power television station in San Juan, Puerto Rico, affiliated with TCT. It is owned by Mako Communications. The station's transmitter is located in Bayamon.

Technical information

Subchannels
The station's digital signal is multiplexed:

References

05DK-D
Television channels and stations established in 2022
Low-power television stations in the United States